The Tanga International Conference Centre (TICC) is located in Tanga, Tanzania.

References

External links
Conference tourism picks up

Convention centres in Tanzania
Social enterprises
Buildings and structures in Tanga, Tanzania